Raj Niwas is the planned official residence and work place for the Lieutenant Governor of Ladakh in Leh, the capital of union territory of Ladakh.

See also
List of official residences of India
Raj Niwas

References

Governors' houses in India
Government of Ladakh
Buildings and structures in Ladakh
Leh